Joop Gall (born 25 December 1963) is a Dutch football manager and former player.

Playing career
Born in Hoogezand-Sappemeer, Groningen, Gall spent his entire career playing with three teams, all from the North of the Netherlands: BV Veendam, FC Groningen and SC Heerenveen. He retired in 1999 after a third spell with BV Veendam.

Coaching career
From 2001 to 2005 Gall served as assistant coach at FC Groningen. In 2005, he was appointed head coach of Eerste Divisie club BV Veendam, a position he left six years laters in 2011 to take over at Go Ahead Eagles. Gall was sacked by Go Ahead Eagles in March 2012, with the club in 11th place. Since July 2012 Gall is the FC Emmen manager.

In April 2018, he was announced as caretaker manager of VV Pelikaan-S until the end of the season. One year later, he was once again appointed as caretaker manager, this time for SV DFS.

References

External links
 
 Profile

1963 births
Living people
People from Hoogezand-Sappemeer
Association football defenders
Dutch footballers
Dutch football managers
SC Veendam players
SC Veendam managers
Go Ahead Eagles managers
FC Emmen managers
SC Heerenveen players
FC Groningen players
Eredivisie players
Eerste Divisie players
Ukrainian Premier League managers
FC Stal Kamianske managers
Dutch expatriate football managers
Expatriate football managers in Ukraine
Dutch expatriate sportspeople in Ukraine
SV Spakenburg managers
Guangzhou City F.C. non-playing staff
PSM Makassar managers
Dutch expatriate sportspeople in Indonesia
Expatriate football managers in Indonesia
Footballers from Groningen (province)